Hugh Henry James Gray (1921 - c.2003) was Archdeacon of Ossory and Leighlin from 1983 to 1992.

Gray was born in Cavan, educated at Trinity College, Dublin and ordained in 1950. After a curacy in Enniscorthy he held incumbencies at Fenagh and Clonenagh.  He was Treasurer of Leighlin Cathedral from 1978 to 1980; and its Chancellor from 1980 to 1983.

He retired in 1996 and died c.2003.

References

1921 births
Year of death missing
Alumni of Trinity College Dublin
Archdeacons of Ossory and Leighlin